The Dortch Plantation, also known as the William P. Dortch House or the Marlsgate Plantation, is an historic house near Scott, Arkansas.  Dortch House is the only plantation home in Arkansas that is fully furnished in the antebellum period style and available for tours and private events.

The house and parts of the plantation were listed on the National Register of Historic Places in 1975.  The NRHP listing was increased in 1979 to cover additional building(s) dating from 1888.

History 
The original plantation property, totaling 1,600 acres, was a wedding gift to Mr. and Mrs. Dortch by Mrs. Dortch's parents, Thomas and Elizabeth Steele.  The first house on the Dortch Plantation was built by the Dortches in 1888.

The Dortch Planation eventually expanded to over 7,000 acres with cotton, rice, corn and soy beans under cultivation. Upon the death of her husband Mrs. Dortch divided the property equally among her five sons.

Dortch House 

Built in 1904, the Dortch House was designed by Arkansas architect Charles L. Thompson. It was described as one of the finest private residences in Arkansas. The Dortch House has a Neoclassical, Greek Revival design.  It features 30 rooms in a total of eleven thousand square feet of living space.

On the front portico facing Bearskin Lake, doric columns rise over forty feet in height. The interior features a dramatic double staircase, original beveled glass windows, sliding oak pocket doors, handcrafted woodwork and Carrara marble fireplaces.

Plantation gardens and other buildings 
The Dortch plantation complex includes  four distinct gardens designed by the Arkansas garden designer P. Allen Smith. Several outbuildings date to the original 1888 farmstead including the carriage house, a well house, a smoke house, stable house, and a pole barn, all of which are included in the National Register designation. The guest house at Dortch is modeled on Farmington Historic Home built in Louisville, Kentucky in 1812 and designed by Thomas Jefferson.

Bearskin lake 
The Dortch plantation is situated on Bearskin Lake, an oxbow lake that was originally a channel of the Arkansas River. Located along the Mississippi Flyway, the lake wildlife habitat features a broad range of wildlife including migratory waterfowl, a nesting pair of bald eagles and freshwater fish.

The banks of Bearskin Lake also served as an camping ground for Arkansas' Native American cultures, most notably the Plum Bayou Culture (A.D. 650 to 1050) known for constructing Toltec Mounds near Scott.  Artifacts collected from the surface of Native American sites by the Dortch and Burrow family members were donated to the Toltec museum in the 1970s and are on display there.

See also
National Register of Historic Places listings in Lonoke County, Arkansas

References

 Arkansas Historic Preservation Program, Department of Arkansas Heritage.
 The Encyclopedia of Arkansas History.
 Additional details provided by Dortch and Burrow family members.
 Oral history recordings of Madalyn Breitzke Dortch courtesy of the Butler Center for Arkansas Studies, Central Arkansas Library System.

Houses on the National Register of Historic Places in Arkansas
Houses completed in 1904
Houses in Lonoke County, Arkansas
National Register of Historic Places in Lonoke County, Arkansas
1904 establishments in Arkansas